Hiruko the Goblin is a 1991 Japanese horror film directed by Shinya Tsukamoto and starring Kenji Sawada. It is based on a manga by Daijiro Morohoshi.

Plot
Reijiro Hieda is a young and energetic archeologist, albeit a discredited one for advocating wild theories about the supernatural. A letter from his brother-in-law Takashi Yabe, a junior high school teacher, tells of his discovery of an ancient tomb built to seal an evil spirit (yōkai).  Yabe and one of his students, Reiko Tsukishima, investigate the burial mound but mysteriously disappear.  Hieda arrives in town to look into the matter.  Yabe's son, Masao, searches for his father in the school during summer vacation and sees a returned Reiko at the schoolhouse, seemingly seducing his gardening classmate Kono. Masao finds himself afflicted with mysterious incidents where his back seemingly heats up and emits smoke; small blackened faces of the dead appear on his back during these fits.  Masao and Hieda search the schoolhouse with Hieda's array of gadgets; both Kono and Masao's friends Aoi and Katagiri are found horrifically murdered by a switchblade.  The nephew and uncle pair initially suspects the suspicious janitor, Watanabe, who had tried to keep people away from the schoolhouse, but soon realize that the disembodied singing head of Reiko is at fault.

Hieda discovers the elder Yabe's notebook, where he learns that a yōkai named Hiruko was sealed away in the tomb.  He believes Hiruko is at fault for the recent incidents, and sets out to learn the spells to open and close the way into the burial mound sanctum.  Watanabe, who had earlier cut the power lines to the schoolhouse, attacks the pair, though Masao successfully takes his gun in the struggle.  Back at the schoolhouse again, the pair encounter Reiko, whose head is now mounted on spider-legs.  Watanabe attacks Hieda, while Reiko attacks Masao.  After escaping from the schoolhouse, Reiko gains insect-like wings and the four have another scuffle, although Reiko escapes after being repelled by bug spray.  Watanabe explains that as a child, he knew Tatsuhiko Yabe, Masao's grandfather.  Tatsuhiko also bore the scars of dead men's heads on his back, and somehow sealed the gate 60 years ago; he swore Watanabe to guard the schoolhouse after his death to prevent a recurrence of the tragedy.  The group realizes that Masao's father reached the interior of the chamber, but was betrayed.  The "crown" with which to seal Hiruko, a missing Yabe family treasure, had likely been taken by Takashi and was likely still in the sealed chamber.  Watanabe, who had previously been attacked by Reiko and realizes his will is being corrupted by her, commits suicide with his gun.

At the burial mound, Hieda uses a spell from the Kojiki to open the sealed chamber: the story of Izanagi and his wife Izanami, who was sealed away in a cave.  Inside, the pair find the sealed yokai, the crown (which appears a normal helmet), as well as Masao's father.  The elder Yabe had become a spider-head abomination as well, however.  As the two escape, they find Reiko and her transformed victims seemingly waiting to block their exit - but the victims instead let them pass, enter the tomb, and hold off the others while Hieda uses the incantation to close the gate.  The pair believe they have finished, but Reiko had somehow snuck onto Hieda's back, and she uses the opportunity to grab onto his face and influence him to open the gate again using memories of his dead wife.  Masao, finding the helmet once again has three horns, uses the closing incantation again, this time sending the Hiruko-possessed Reiko back into the underworld.

Cast
 Kenji Sawada as Reijirou Hieda
 Masaki Kudou as Masao Yabe
 Hideo Murota as Watanabe
 Naoto Takenaka as Takashi Yabe
 Megumi Ueno as Reiko Tsukishima

Production
Production began in the summer of 1990. Financing was provided through the PFF Scholarship, which Tsukamoto had won with his previous film. Filming was split between the town of Asahi, Toyama and a Toho sound stage. Production was tense, with crew members complaining about having to work under a younger director, and Tsukamoto getting into a physical altercation with cast member Hideo Murota, who refused to follow his directions. The film went over budget near the end of production, requiring crew members to have to finish it for free.

Release
The film was released in Japan on May 11, 1991. Shochiku handled the release and distribution of the film, heavily promoting it through expensive television and billboard advertisements. However, the film was a financial flop, and was critically panned. The film was released on Blu-ray in the west in early 2022, with Third Window Films handling the release in Europe, and Mondo Macabro handling the release in North America.

Reception
In his book Horror and Science Fiction Film IV, Donald C Willis stated that Hiruko the Goblin was a variation of Bug, The Fly, Attack of the Crab Monsters and A Nightmare on Elm Street III, but "puts a fresh weird spin on each variation". Noting that "the film is situated amusingly between the comic, the creepy, the campy and Luis Buñuel."

Notes

References

External links

1991 films
1991 horror films
1990s Japanese films
1990s Japanese-language films
1990s supernatural horror films
Films directed by Shinya Tsukamoto
Japanese ghost films
Japanese supernatural horror films
Live-action films based on manga